Dupuyer is a census-designated place and unincorporated community in Pondera County, Montana, United States. Its population was 86 as of the 2010 census. The community is located along U.S. Route 89 and Dupuyer Creek. Dupuyer has a post office with ZIP code 59432.

The town takes its name from Dupuyer Creek, which borders the town. It began as a stagecoach stop in 1877 on the Fort Benton–Fort Browning road.

Demographics

Climate
According to the Köppen Climate Classification system, Dupuyer has a semi-arid climate, abbreviated "BSk" on climate maps.

References

Census-designated places in Pondera County, Montana
Census-designated places in Montana
Unincorporated communities in Montana
Unincorporated communities in Pondera County, Montana